The German American Heritage Center, also known as the Germania-Miller/Standard Hotel, is a cultural center and museum in Davenport, Iowa, United States, that chronicles and preserves the history of German-Americans in the Midwest region. The building was listed on the National Register of Historic Places in 1983.

History
The German American Heritage Center was incorporated in 1994, and the board of directors purchased the Standard Hotel on the Davenport riverfront in 1995. The building was built by John Brus and opened in 1862 as the Germania House, a gasthaus (guest house), for immigrants. In 1876 it was bought by John Frederick Miller and renamed the Miller Hotel.  He was a German immigrant who had been a manufacturer in the city since the 1850s.  Miller also operated the restaurant, billiard room and saloon in the hotel until 1889.  The hotel was used at this time by Scott County farmers when they came to Davenport. The hotel's name was changed several times in the 20th-century. It became the Arcade Hotel around 1906, the Henry Blessing Boarding House around 1917, and the Standard Hotel from 1924 to 1995. The retail space on the main floor was occupied by various tenants over the years. In 1983, the building was placed on the National Register of Historic Places, and on the Davenport Register of Historic Properties in 1996. In 2009, extensive renovations to the center were completed with enhanced multimedia and exhibit spaces.

Architecture
The building is a fine example of high Victorian commercial architecture in Davenport. Of particular merit is the metal cornice that was apparently added by John Miller, whose name appears on it. The original storefronts had been removed and were restored in the 2009 renovation. The easternmost bay, where the hotel's main entrance was located, is more decorative than the other six and is below the cornice arch.

References

External links
 GAHC.org
 Preserve America site for Davenport 
 Transportation Enhancements Image Library Images from the Restoration of the German American Heritage Center

Victorian architecture in Iowa
Residential buildings completed in 1862
Museums in Davenport, Iowa
Ethnic museums in Iowa
Museums of human migration
Buildings and structures in Davenport, Iowa
Hotel buildings on the National Register of Historic Places in Iowa
Culture of the Quad Cities
German-American history
German-American culture in Iowa
National Register of Historic Places in Davenport, Iowa
Davenport Register of Historic Properties
German-American museums
1994 establishments in Iowa